Alan Rothwell (born 9 February 1937) is an English actor and television presenter. He played David Barlow in the ITV soap opera Coronation Street as a regular from 1960 to 1961, and again from 1963 to 1968. His other acting credits include playing Mike in Top Secret (1961–1962), a recurring role in Heartbeat (1994–1995), and various roles in Doctors (2004–2016). He also presented the children's television series Picture Box and Hickory House.

Career
Rothwell was born in Oldham, Lancashire. He first came to fame playing the character Jimmy Grange in The Archers, then David Barlow in the then new ITV soap opera Coronation Street as a regular from December 1960 until June 1961, then appeared for two episodes in June 1963, before returning as a regular from December 1964 to April 1968. The character was killed off off-screen two years later. He also featured as a regular character in all 26 episodes of the 1961–1962 British spy series Top Secret in the role of "Mike". He was a guest star in Gideon's Way 1964 as a young man wrongly accused of killing his girlfriend played by Carol White. He also had roles in the lost 1960 film Linda, also starring Carol White, and the 1971 film Zeppelin, starring Michael York and Elke Sommer.

Rothwell then became known as a presenter to a generation of children, appearing on the children's television programmes Picture Box from 1969 to 1990 and Hickory House from 1973 to 1978. 
 
He returned to soap operas in 1985, this time as the heroin addict Nicholas Black in Brookside. In 2002, he appeared in the television drama film Shipman. He also played Gerry Stringer in all six episodes of Dead Man Weds in 2005. Among his many other television credits are parts in Casualty, Emmerdale, Heartbeat, Doctors, Shameless and Bedlam, A Song For Jenny, (BBC 2015), Rovers, (Jellylegs, 2016). In 2004, Rothwell guest-starred in the Doctor Who audio adventure The Twilight Kingdom.

In 2015, he appeared as a villager in the BBC TV series The Musketeers episode 2.5 "The Return".

In 2018, he appeared as Douglas in 20th Century-Fox's British comedy, Walk Like A Panther, released in cinemas 9 March.

References

English male soap opera actors
English male stage actors
1937 births
Living people
Male actors from Oldham
20th-century English male actors
21st-century English male actors
British children's television presenters
English television presenters